The Alphabet Show is a late-1990s television show broadcast on UK Play. It was presented by Lauren Laverne and Chris Addison. Each episode focused on a different letter of the alphabet, it featured music videos and discussion loosely related to the chosen letter.

Play UK original programming